NS as an abbreviation can mean:

Arts and entertainment

Gaming
 Natural Selection (video game), a mod for the game Half-life
 NetStorm: Islands At War, a real-time strategy game published in 1997 by Activision
 Nintendo Switch, a hybrid video game console and handheld.
 NationStates, a web-based simulation game

Literature
 New Spring (known to fans as "NS"), a 1999 anthology edited by Robert Silverberg and derivative 2004 novella by Robert Jordan
 NS-series robots from the book I, Robot

Companies
 National Semiconductor (also known as "Natsemi"), an American integrated circuit design and manufacturing company
 Nederlandse Spoorwegen, the main public transport railway company in the Netherlands
 Norfolk Southern Railway, a major Class I railroad in the United States, owned by the Norfolk Southern Corporation
 Norfolk Southern Railway (1942–1982), the final name of a railroad running in Virginia and North Carolina before its acquisition by the Southern Railway in 1974

Government and politics
 Nasjonal Samling, a 1930s Norwegian national socialist political party
 National service, a name for the conscription system of some militaries
 "National Socialism" or Nazism, the ideology held by, amongst many other political parties, the National Socialist German Workers Party
 New Serbia (political party) (Nova Srbija), a political party in Serbia
 People's Party (Narodna stranka), a political party in Serbia
 New Slovenia (also known as Nova Slovenija - Krscanski Ljudska Stranka), a right-of-centre political party in Slovenia
 People's Party (Montenegro) (Narodna Stranka), a political party in the Republic of Montenegro

Places
 Negeri Sembilan, one of the fourteen states in Malaysia
 Novi Sad, a city in Serbia (license plate code)
 Nova Scotia, as the official Canadian postal abbreviation for the province

Science and technology

Biology and medicine
 Nervous system, the system of neurons that coordinates the actions of an organism
 Normal saline, a solution of sodium chloride used in intravenous drips

Computing
 Name server, a computer server that implements a name service protocol
 NS record, a DNS record type
 Namespace, an abstract container used in computing
 Neighbor Solicitation, part of IPv6's Neighbor Discovery Protocol
 NeXTSTEP, an object-oriented, multitasking operating system by NeXT, as well as a prefix for certain system-provided classes in the operating system, such as "NSString"
 ns (simulator) (or "ns-2"), an open source network simulator

Mathematics
 ns (elliptic function), one of Jacobi's elliptic functions

Other uses in science and technology
 Nanosecond (abbreviated "ns"), a measure of time
 Nanostructure
 Neutron star, a star formed from the collapsed remnant of a massive star
 New Shepard 3 (NS3), a reusable launch vehicle from Blue Origin, being tested in 2017-18
 Newton second, the SI derived unit for momentum
 Not significant, when differences between categories are smaller than the amount of error/noise in the data, see Statistical significance
 Nuclear Ship (NS), a ship prefix for civilian ship names
 Norsk Standard, Norwegian Standard, Standards defined by Standard Norge

Other uses
 National school (Ireland), a type of school 
 New Style (as "N.S." in opposition to Old Style as "O.S."), indicating either a date in the Julian Calendar with the start of year adjusted to 1 January, or a date in the Gregorian calendar